The Office of the Comptroller and Auditor General of Bangladesh  (C&AG) is the Supreme Audit Institution (SAI) of the country. Like the SAIs in many other countries across the world the institution is established by the Constitution of Bangladesh. This institute is responsible for maintaining accounts of the republic and audits all receipts and expenditure of the Government of Bangladesh, including those of bodies and authorities substantially financed by the government. The reports of the CAG are discussed by the Public Accounts Committee, which is a standing committee in the Parliament of Bangladesh.

In more recent times, in addition to carrying out the traditional approach of conducting financial audits and compliance audits, the Office of the Comptroller and Auditor General of Bangladesh (OCAG) has introduced performance audits, which focus on evaluating economy, efficiency and effectiveness in the management of public resources of different government entities.

Constitutional mandate

The Constitution of Bangladesh provides the CAG of the country with absolute independence; hence, he is not answerable to any other authority to gain access to all documents required while conducting an audit. Article 127–132 of the constitution of the country illustrates the establishment, functions, terms of office and so on of the Auditor General. Correspondent articles are given below:

127. Establishment of office of Auditor-General

(1) There shall be a Comptroller and Auditor-General of Bangladesh (hereinafter referred to as the Auditor-General) who shall be appointed by the President.

(2) Subject to the provisions of this Constitution and of any law made by Parliament, the conditions of service of the Auditor-General shall be such as the President may, by order, determine.

128. Functions of Auditor-General

(1) The public accounts of the Republic and of all courts of law and all authorities and officers of the Government shall be audited and reported on by the Auditor-General and for that purpose he or any person authorized by him in that behalf shall have access to all records, books, vouchers, documents, cash, stamps, securities, stores or other government property in the possession of any person in the service of the Republic.

(2) Without prejudice to the provisions of clause (1), if it is prescribed by law in the case of any body corporate directly established by law, the accounts of that body corporate shall be audited and reported on by such person as may be so prescribed.

(3) Parliament may by law require the Auditor-General to exercise such functions, in addition to those specified in clause (1), as such law may prescribe, and until provision is made by law under this clause the President may, by order, make such provision.

(4) The Auditor-General, in the exercise of his functions under clause (1), shall not be subject to the direction or control of any other person or authority.

129. Term of office of Auditor-General

[(1) The Auditor-General shall, subject to the provisions of this article, hold office for five years from the date on which he entered upon his office, or until he attains the age of sixty five years, whichever is earlier.] 

(2) The Auditor-General shall not be removed from his office except in like manner and on the like ground as a judge of the [Supreme Court] .

(3) The Auditor-General may resign his office by writing under his hand addressed to the President.

(4) On ceasing to hold office the Auditor-General shall not be eligible for further office in the service of the Republic.

130. Acting Auditor-General

At any time when the office of Auditor-General is vacant, or the President is satisfied that the Auditor-General is unable to perform his functions on account of absence, illness or any other cause, the President may appoint a person to act as Auditor-General and to perform the functions of that office until an appointment is made under article 127 or, as the case may be until the Auditor-General resumes the functions of his office.

131. Form and manner of keeping public accounts

The public accounts of the Republic shall be kept in such form and in such manner as the Auditor-General may, with the approval of the President, prescribe.

132. Reports of Auditor-General to be laid before Parliament

The reports of the Auditor-General relating to the Reports of public accounts of the Republic shall be submitted to the President, who shall cause them to be laid before Parliament.

List of Comptrollers and Auditors General
On 11 May 1973, the first Comptroller and Auditor-General was appointed by the government of Bangladesh. Since then there were 11 distinguished persons who successfully led office of the comptroller and auditor general of Bangladesh. A list is given below including the running CAG-

 auditor officials monir hossen murad/ 27 April 2022

Functional areas
At present, there are 17 (seventeen) different Audit Directorates, carrying out audits on behalf of the CAG in the government offices and the public sector entities. Each of the Directorates is headed by a Director General. Audit observations involving considerable financial anomalies are primarily included into Advance Paras (AP). Later considering adequately the responses of the auditee organization and the concerned Principal Accounting Officer (often the concerned Secretary of the Ministry) Advanced Paras might be transformed into Draft Paras (DP). The DPs form part of the audit reports if it is justified and approved by the CAG of Bangladesh. A list of audit directorates are given below:

1.  Directorate of Civil Audit
2.  Directorate of Revenue Audit
3.  Directorate of Commercial Audit
4.  Directorate of Works Audit
5.  Directorate of Transport Audit
6.  Directorate of Foreign Aided Project Audit
7.  Directorate of Postal, Telecommunication, Science & Technology Audit
8.  Directorate of Defense Audit
9.  Directorate of Health Audit
10. Directorate of Education Audit
11. Directorate of Agriculture & Environment Audit
12. Directorate of Local Government & Rural Development Audit
13. Directorate of Social Safety Net Audit
14. Directorate of Power & Energy Audit
15. Directorate of IT & Public Services Audit
16. Directorate of Constitutional Bodies Audit
17. Directorate of Mission Audit

Activities
The OCAG plays a critical role in enhancing financial accountability and transparency and assist the Parliament in holding the public officials accountable for their actions by providing objective opinion on the use of public funds. It also plays an important role in reducing the fiduciary risks in public investment. The audit services provided by OCAG are broadly of three categories as follows and guided by the Government Auditing Standards, Code of Ethics and Quality Control System issued by the CAG. Major areas of activities are given below-

Compliance audit
Compliance audit (CA) focuses on whether a particular subject matter is in compliance with authorities identified as criteria. The subject matter of the compliance audit is determined by the audit scope and objective.

Further information about CA: 
Compliance Audit Guidelines

Financial audit
Financial audits (FA) are attestation engagement. The subject matters (financial position, financial performance, cash flow statement, Owner’s equity statement) of financial audits recognized and measured against the criteria of financial reporting framework by the responsible party who presents the financial statements which are treated as subject matter information.

Further information about FA:
Financial Audit Guidelines

Performance audit
Performance audit (PA) focuses on whether interventions, programs, and institutions are performing in accordance with the principles of economy, efficiency, and effectiveness and whether there is room for improvement. The subject matter of a performance audit is defined by the audit objectives.

Activities with Parliamentary Committees
SAI Bangladesh provides strong support to the following standing committees of Bangladesh National Parliament:

1. Standing Committee on Public Accounts.

2. Standing Committee on Public Undertakings.

3. Committee on Estimates.

Comptroller and Auditor General of Bangladesh remains present in the meetings of these committees and gives his opinions on any technical issues that may arise during the deliberations in the meetings of these committees.

Human resources
The skill and academic background of the OCAG staff is varied with the managerial staff of the office boosting diverse expertise. The diversity is often considered to be of great use in carrying out audit activities of the office. At present, approximately four thousand officers and staff are working in the OCAG, and an estimated thirteen percent of the total workforce is women. However, the female representation in the staff level is considerably higher than that in the managerial level.

OCAG employees have differing academic backgrounds. All officials and staff have a bachelor’s degree at the minimum. However, there are official have professional degrees or other higher academic credentials. After joining the department, they have to undergo rigorous trainings in the Financial management Academy-FIMA, a dedicated training outfit of OCAG In addition, there is a continuous professional development scheme to upgrade their skills and professional knowledge. 

Following the recent restructuring, there are 17 Audit Directorates within Office of the Comptroller and Auditor General (OCAG) with a total sanctioned manpower of 15,030.  Currently, the male- female ratio of employees is 82:18 (approximately). However, the number of female employees is increasing every year. In terms of job placement, training and other opportunities, female employees have equal access.

Financial Management Academy (FIMA)
Financial Management Academy (FIMA) is the training wing of OCAG Bangladesh, the supreme audit institution of the country. This Academy is established aiming at providing the much needed know- how to enhance professionalism of both the BCS (Audit & Accounts) Cadre officers as well as staff of Audit and Accounts Department. It's the home for BCS (Audit & Accounts) Cadre Officials. The responsibility of the institute is to add value to the skills of the employees of the department. The institution offers necessary auditing, accounting and financing knowledge to the employees of the department in an effort to ensure sound financial management of the country.

International Relations
OCAG Bangladesh, the supreme audit institution of the country, is an active member of Asian Organization of Supreme Audit Institutions (ASOSAI) and International Organization of Supreme Audit Institutions (INTOSAI) for a long period now. SAI Bangladesh is fully committed to the goals of these organisations and has recognised the necessity of international collaboration for excellence.

INTOSAI and SAI Bangladesh 

The International Organization of Supreme Audit Institutions (INTOSAI) operates as an umbrella organization for the external government audit community. INTOSAI is an autonomous, independent and non-political organization.

The Comptroller and Auditor General of Bangladesh is the member of the following three INTOSAI Working Groups and two INTOSAI Sub-Committees:

Working groups 
 Working group on IT Audit.
 Working group on Environmental Auditing.
 Working group on Big Data.
 
Sub-Committees
 Internal Control Standards Sub-Committee under Professional Standards Committee. 
 Subcommittee on Peer Review under Capacity Building Committee (CBC).

ASOSAI and SAI Bangladesh

The Asian Organization of Supreme Audit Institutions (ASOSAI) is one of the seven regional working groups of INTOSAI. Comptroller and Auditor General of Bangladesh has been elected member of ASOSAI Governing Board for 2018-21. The Governing Board is the executive arm of the Organization. Office of the Comptroller and Auditor General of Bangladesh hosted 55th ASOSAI Governing Board Meeting virtually. 

INTOSAI Webinar

Officials from SAI, Bangladesh attends important webinars organized by INTOSAI. In the meanwhile, they have participated in the webinars on: 

 Enterprise-wide Audit Process and Knowledge Management IT System (OIOS Project) on 15 March 2021.
 IPSAS-Implications for SAIs on 28 January 2021 
 Information Technology Audit on 16 October 2020.

In addition, SAI Bangladesh officials conduct trainings in the international training programmes organized by INTOSAI Development Initiative (IDI) and ASOSAI.

References

External links 
 

Government agencies of Bangladesh
Government audit
Organisations based in Dhaka
1973 establishments in Bangladesh
Supreme audit institutions